Charles-Édouard Chaise (1759, Paris – 1798, Fontainebleau) was a French neoclassical painter.

Life
His father was a painter, art dealer and member of the Académie de Saint-Luc. Charles-Edouard studied under Jean Bonvoisin in 1775, then under Jean-Jacques Lagrenée, before winning second prize in the 1778 prix de Rome with David condemning to death the Amalekite bringing him Saul's diadem.

Surviving works 

 Nancy, Musée des Beaux-Arts, Herminie mourning for Tancred, drawing, 1792.
 Reims, Musée des Beaux-Arts, Pelias's daughters demanding that Medea rejuvenate their father, oil on canvas.
 Strasbourg, Musée des Beaux-Arts, Theseus, defeater of the Minotaur, oil on canvas

Salons 
1783, Salon de la Correspondance 
 XXII, A Vestal offering a sacrifice.
 XXIII, Another [Vestal] who reverses the altar on which the sacred flame burns
 XXIV, The Prodigal Son.
 LIX, A painting representing Hope consoling Love
 LX,  A sketch representing Innocence seduced by Love

1791, Salon de la Société des Amis des Arts
 n° 61, Sketch for his painting of Oedipus discovered by Shepherds
 n° 62, Sketch for his painting of the death of Diogenes
 n° 63, Crayon drawing in three colours, historical subject
 n° 95, Prudence sleeping.

Salons (of the ex-académie Royale)

1791 
 n° 128, Young woman making an offering to the god Pan
 n° 647, Prudence sleeping.
 n° 724, Shepherds of Arcadia.
 n° 733,  Pelias's daughters demanding that Medea rejuvenate their father, Musée de Reims.
 n° 764, Festival to Bacchus.

1793
 n° 23, Two young people at a window.
 n° 260, Septimius Severus reproaching his son for having wished to assassinate him.
 n° 266, Young woman at her toilette

Bibliography 
  Dominique Jacquot, «À propos de Thésée vainqueur du Minotaure du musée des Beaux-Arts de Strasbourg. Jalons pour Charles-Édouard Chaise.» La Revue des Musées de France. Revue du Louvre, 1 February 2007, pages 55–60

1759 births
1798 deaths
18th-century French painters
French male painters
18th-century French male artists